is a passenger railway station located in the town of Kyōtamba, Funai District, Kyoto Prefecture, Japan, operated by West Japan Railway Company (JR West).

Lines

Station layout
The station consists of two opposed ground-level side platforms connected to the station building by a footbridge. The station is unattended.

Platforms

Adjacent stations

History
Tachiki Station opened on April 25, 1946 as a signal stop, and was upgraded to a full passenger station on November 1, 1947. With the privatization of the Japan National Railways (JNR) on April 1, 1987, the station came under the aegis of the West Japan Railway Company.

Passenger statistics
In fiscal 2016, the station was used by an average of 18 passengers daily.

Surrounding area
 Yura River
 Japan National Route 27

See also
List of railway stations in Japan

External links

 Station Official Site

Railway stations in Kyoto Prefecture
Sanin Main Line
Railway stations in Japan opened in 1947
Kyōtamba, Kyoto